was a  light cruiser in the Imperial Japanese Navy. She was named after the Sendai River in southern Kyūshū. Sendai was the lead ship of the three vessels completed in her class of light cruisers, and like other vessels of her class, she was intended for use as the flagship of a destroyer flotilla.

Service career

Early career
Sendai was completed at the Mitsubishi Nagasaki shipyards on 29 April 1924. Immediately on completion, she was assigned to Yangtze River patrol in China. She played an important role in the Battle of Shanghai in the opening stages of the Second Sino-Japanese War, and later covered the landings of Japanese forces in southern China.

Invasions of Southeast Asia

On 20 November 1941, Sendai became flagship of Destroyer Squadron 3 (DesRon 3) under Rear Admiral Shintaro Hashimoto.

At the time of the attack on Pearl Harbor, Sendai was engaged in escorting transports carrying Lieutenant General Tomoyuki Yamashita and the Japanese 25th Army to invade Malaya. At 23:45 on 7 December 1941, Sendai and her destroyer squadron (and ) commenced a bombardment of Kota Bharu, Malaya. They were attacked by seven RAAF Hudson bombers, which sank one of the transports and damaged two others.

On 9 December 1941, the submarine  reported sighting of Royal Navy Force Z (the Royal Navy battleship , battlecruiser  and supporting destroyers). The report was received by Sendai, which relayed the message to Vice Admiral Jisaburō Ozawa aboard his flagship, the heavy cruiser . However, the reception was poor and the message took another 90 minutes to decode. Moreover, I-65s report was incorrect about the heading of Force Z. The following day, Force Z was overwhelmed by torpedo bombers of the 22nd Air Flotilla from Indochina.

On 19 December 1941, off Kota Bahru in the South China Sea, Royal Netherlands Navy submarine  sighted Sendai escorting the second Malaya Convoy's 39 transports. That night, O 20 surfaced to recharge her batteries, and a flame from her engines' exhaust gave her away; she was sunk by Uranami.

Sendai made three more troop convoy escort runs to Malay at the end of December 1941 and in January 1942. On the fourth run, on 10 January 1942, the US submarine  spotted the convoy and fired two torpedoes at the last transport, but both missed. The torpedoes from the Allied vessels missed, and the destroyer  and Sendai returned gunfire. Thanet was sunk, while Vampire was undamaged and escaped to Singapore.

From February through March, Sendai was assigned to cover Japanese landings in Sumatra, and in sweeping the sea lanes and the Strait of Malacca for British and Dutch vessels escaping from Singapore. At the end of March, Sendai covered the landing of one battalion of the IJA's 18th Infantry Division at Port Blair, Andaman Islands. At the end of April, Sendai returned to Sasebo for repairs.

Battle of Midway
On 29 May 1942, Sendai departed with the Main Body of the Combined Fleet for Midway. The Main Body remained  behind Vice Admiral  Chuichi Nagumo's First Carrier Striking Force and thus did not engage American forces. Sendai returned to Kure on 14 June 1942 without having seen combat.

Solomon Islands campaigns
On 15 July 1942, DesRon 3 was reassigned to the Southwest Force to cover operations in Burma and raids in the Indian Ocean, arriving at Mergui, Burma 31 July. However, with American landings on Guadalcanal, the planned Indian Ocean operations were cancelled and Sendai was sent to Makassar, Davao and Truk instead, to escort troop convoys to Rabaul, New Britain and Shortland, Bougainville. On 8 September, Sendai shelled Tulagi, and on 12 September she and the destroyers Shikinami,  and  bombarded Henderson Field, Guadalcanal. Sendai remained active in Solomon Island operations through November 1942, participating in both the First Naval Battle of Guadalcanal (where she remained as distant cover) and the Second Naval Battle of Guadalcanal (where she was attacked by the battleship 's  main guns but escaped undamaged).

On 25 February 1943, Sendai was reassigned to the Eighth Fleet at Rabaul under Vice Admiral Gunichi Mikawa and remained on patrol around Rabaul through April. Returning to Sasebo in May, Sendai was repaired and modified. Her No.5  gun mount was removed and two triple 25 mm AA gun mounts and Type 21 radar were installed. Repairs were completed 25 June 1943 and Sendai returned to Truk on 5 July. On 7 July, Rear Admiral Baron Matsuji Ijuin assumed command of DesRon 3. During the next three months, Sendai operated out of Rabaul covering reinforcement convoys to Buin, Papua New Guinea and Shortland.

On 18 July 1943, off Kolombangara, the group was attacked by Guadalcanal-based Marine Grumman TBF Avenger torpedo bombers, and two days later by North American B-25 Mitchell medium bombers but was not damaged; it also escaped damage after being bombed by a Consolidated B-24 Liberator heavy bomber on 1 November 1943.

Sendai also turned hard starboard, but bore down on Shigure, barely avoiding a collision. All four Allied cruisers took Sendai under radar directed 6-inch fire. They hit her with their first salvo and more thereafter, setting her afire. Captain Shoji and 184 crewmen went down with the ship, but 236 other crewmen were rescued by destroyers.

Sendai was removed from the Navy List on 5 January 1944.

References

Notes

Books

External links

tabular record:  CombinedFleet.com: Sendai history

Sendai-class cruisers
Ships built by Mitsubishi Heavy Industries
1923 ships
Second Sino-Japanese War cruisers of Japan
World War II cruisers of Japan
World War II shipwrecks in the Pacific Ocean
Maritime incidents in November 1943